The Gran Premio José Pedro Ramírez is a Group I flat race for three-year-olds and up, run over a distance of 2400 metres every January 6 in Hipódromo Nacional de Maroñas racetrack in Montevideo, Uruguay.

Results

Winners of the "Ramírez" at Maroñas Entertainment

Bibliography
 Winners of the Gran Premio José Pedro Ramírez

Horse races in Uruguay